Get It Out'cha System is a 1978 album by singer-songwriter Millie Jackson. David Van DePitte was responsible for the string and horn arrangements.

It peaked at #55 on the Billboard 200.

Track listings
"Go Out and Get Some (Get It Out 'Cha System)" – (Millie Jackson, Randy Klein) 2:47	
"Keep The Home Fire Burnin'" – (Benny Latimore, Steve Alaimo) 3:09	
"Logs and Thangs" – (Benny Latimore, Millie Jackson) 5:46	
"Put Something Down On It" – (Bobby Womack, Cecil Womack) 5:31	
"Here You Come Again" – (Barry Mann, Cynthia Weil) 3:10	
"Why Say You're Sorry" – (Brad Shapiro, Millie Jackson) 3:42	
"He Wants To Hear The Words"  – (Kathy Wakefield, Ken Hirsch) 3:14	
"I Just Wanna Be With You" – (Brad Shapiro, Millie Jackson) 3:57	
"Sweet Music Man" – (Kenny Rogers) 6:14

Charts

Singles

References

External links
 Millie Jackson-Get It Out'cha System at Discogs

1978 albums
Millie Jackson albums
Albums produced by Brad Shapiro
Spring Records albums